The Pennsville School District is a comprehensive community public school district, that serves students in kindergarten through twelfth grade from Pennsville Township, in Salem County, New Jersey, United States.

As of the 2021–22 school year, the district, comprised of five schools, had an enrollment of 1,809 students and 166.9 classroom teachers (on an FTE basis), for a student–teacher ratio of 10.8:1.

The district is classified by the New Jersey Department of Education as being in District Factor Group "CD", the sixth-highest of eight groupings. District Factor Groups organize districts statewide to allow comparison by common socioeconomic characteristics of the local districts. From lowest socioeconomic status to highest, the categories are A, B, CD, DE, FG, GH, I and J.

Awards and recognition
Penn Beach Elementary School was recognized by Governor Jim McGreevey in 2003 as one of 25 schools selected statewide for the First Annual Governor's School of Excellence award.

Schools
Schools in the district (with 2020–21 enrollment data from the National Center for Education Statistics) are:
Elementary schools
Valley Park Elementary School with 340 students in grades preK-1
Bobbie-Ann Fordham, Principal
Central Park Elementary School with 237 students in grades 2-3
Steven Hindman, Principal
Penn Beach Elementary School with 302 students in grades 4-5
Mark Zoppina, Principal
Middle school
Pennsville Middle School with 450 students in grades 6-8
Carolyn Carels, Principal
High school
Pennsville Memorial High School with 450 students in grades 9-12
Matthew D. McFarland, Principal

Administration
Core members of the district's administration are:
Dr. Michael Brodzik, Superintendent
Heather Mayhew, Business Administrator / Board Secretary

Board of education
The district's board of education, comprised of nine members, sets policy and oversees the fiscal and educational operation of the district through its administration. As a Type II school district, the board's trustees are elected directly by voters to serve three-year terms of office on a staggered basis, with three seats up for election each year held (since 2012) as part of the November general election. The board appoints a superintendent to oversee the district's day-to-day operations and a business administrator to supervise the business functions of the district.

References

External links
Pennsville School District

Data for the Pennsville School District, National Center for Education Statistics

New Jersey District Factor Group CD
Pennsville Township, New Jersey
School districts in Salem County, New Jersey